A beam axle, rigid axle or solid axle is a dependent suspension design in which a set of wheels is connected laterally by a single beam or shaft. Beam axles were once commonly used at the rear wheels of a vehicle, but historically they have also been used as front axles in four-wheel-drive vehicles. In most automobiles, beam axles have been replaced with front and rear independent suspensions.

Implementation

With a beam axle the camber angle between the wheels is the same no matter where it is in the travel of the suspension.

A beam axle's fore & aft location is constrained by either: trailing arms, semi-trailing arms, radius rods, or leaf springs. The lateral location can be constrained by a Panhard rod, a Scott Russell linkage or a Watt's linkage, or some other arrangement, most commonly by the leaf springs. Shock absorbers and either leaf springs, coil springs, or air bags are used to control vertical movement.

The Twist-beam rear suspension is a similar suspension design, however its beam axle is able to twist, thereby functioning as an anti-roll bar to control the roll motion of the body, and is considered to be a semi-independent suspension design.

Live axle vs dead axle

A live axle is a type of beam axle in which the shaft (or, commonly, shafts connected to move as a single unit) also transmits power to the wheels; a beam axle that does not also transmit power is sometimes called a dead axle. While typically used in vehicles with Hotchkiss drive, this suspension system can also be used with other types of power transmission.

Advantages
A beam axle is typically simple in design, rugged, and inexpensive to manufacture.
Only one universal joint or constant-velocity joint is needed at each steered and driven wheel and none are needed at non-steered wheels; this reduces maintenance requirements and manufacturing costs compared to independent suspensions, which typically require two such joints at each driven wheel.
A beam axle is space-efficient, an important advantage for off-road applications, as it provides better vehicle articulation and durability in a high load environment. 
Camber angle is rigidly fixed by axle geometry; for a live axle, toe is typically fixed as well.
As the vehicle's body rolls during hard cornering, the unchanging camber yields predictable handling—at least on smooth surfaces.
Wheel alignment is simplified.
Traction, braking and tire wear characteristics do not change as the suspension is compressed. These are great benefits in a vehicle that carries heavy loads, and together with the beam axle's characteristic strength, this has resulted in front and rear beam axles being nearly universal in buses and heavy-duty trucks. Most light and medium duty pickup trucks, SUVs, and vans also use a beam axle, at least in the rear.

Disadvantages
A beam axle does not allow each wheel to move independently in response to uneven surfaces, and handling is typically worse than more sophisticated suspension designs.
In turns, the outside wheel is often subjected to adverse camber angles when the inside wheel hits a bump, which can suddenly reduce cornering grip and destabilize the vehicle.
Camber angle cannot change during body roll, and the geometric roll center of the suspension is always fixed at the physical axle midpoint, limiting suspension tuning options. Furthermore, the roll center moves in reaction to road irregularities
Toe is typically fixed at zero for a live axle, and dynamic toe control is difficult to implement.
The mass of the beam is part of the unsprung weight of the vehicle, hurting ride quality.
The need for lateral location devices such as a Panhard rod or Watt's linkage adds more unsprung weight and partially offsets the beam axle's advantages in simplicity, space efficiency and cost. 
In a vehicle with conventional Hotchkiss drive, the entire axle may twist in its mounts in reaction to torque loads; during hard acceleration, this may reduce traction and induce wheel hop or sudden adverse toe changes.
The bulky differential housing of a Hotchkiss live axle reduces ground clearance, hindering the vehicle's ability to ford deep mud, clear obstacles and negotiate deeply rutted roads.
The differential housing can only be raised by using larger wheels and tires, typically with a penalty in unsprung weight, braking effectiveness and acquisition costs; furthermore, vehicle modifications may be necessary for adequate fender or frame clearance.
Front beam axle suspension is unusually sensitive to any lack of concentricity in the hub and wheel assembly which can cause a side-to-side oscillation ("shimmy") of the steering at certain speeds (typically ), commonly referred to as "death wobble" within the 4x4 community. This is addressed on some vehicles with steering dampers although removal and careful refitting of the front wheels often cures the problem.

See also 
 Axle
 Twist-beam rear suspension
 Wheelset (rail transport)

Notes 

Automotive suspension technologies